Massive Online Analysis (MOA) is a free open-source software project specific for data stream mining with concept drift. It is written in Java and developed at the University of Waikato, New Zealand.

Description

MOA is an open-source framework software that allows to build and run experiments
of machine learning or data mining on evolving data streams. It includes a set of learners and stream generators that can be used from the Graphical User Interface (GUI), the command-line, and the Java API.
MOA contains several collections of machine learning algorithms:

 Classification
 Bayesian classifiers
 Naive Bayes
 Naive Bayes Multinomial
 Decision trees classifiers
 Decision Stump
 Hoeffding Tree
 Hoeffding Option Tree
 Hoeffding Adaptive Tree
 Meta classifiers
 Bagging
 Boosting
 Bagging using ADWIN
 Bagging using Adaptive-Size Hoeffding Trees.
 Perceptron Stacking of Restricted Hoeffding Trees
 Leveraging Bagging
 Online Accuracy Updated Ensemble
 Function classifiers
 Perceptron
 Stochastic gradient descent (SGD)
 Pegasos
 Drift classifiers
Self-Adjusting Memory
Probabilistic Adaptive Windowing
 Multi-label classifiers
 Active learning classifiers 
 Regression
 FIMTDD
 AMRules
 Clustering
 StreamKM++
 CluStream
 ClusTree
 D-Stream
 CobWeb.
 Outlier detection
 STORM
 Abstract-C
 COD
 MCOD
 AnyOut
 Recommender systems
 BRISMFPredictor
 Frequent pattern mining
 Itemsets
 Graphs
 Change detection algorithms

These algorithms are designed for large scale machine learning, dealing with concept drift, and big data streams in real time.

MOA supports bi-directional interaction with Weka (machine learning). MOA is free software released under the GNU GPL.

See also

 ADAMS Workflow: Workflow engine for MOA and Weka (machine learning)
 Streams: Flexible module environment for the design and execution of data stream experiments  
 Weka (machine learning)
 Vowpal Wabbit
 List of numerical analysis software

References

External links 
 MOA Project home page at University of Waikato in New Zealand 
 SAMOA Project home page at Yahoo Labs

Data mining and machine learning software
Free science software
Java (programming language) software
Free data analysis software